Alver may refer to:

People
 Alver (surname)

Places
 Alver Municipality, a municipality in Vestland county, Norway
 Alver, Norway, a village in Alver municipality in Vestland county, Norway
 Alver (crater), a crater on Mercury

Media
 Luisa Alver, a character on the television show, Jane the Virgin